Drew Westervelt (born April 25, 1985 in Bel Air, Maryland) is a former lacrosse player in the National Lacrosse League and Major League Lacrosse.

College career
Westervelt attended the University of Maryland, Baltimore County, where, as a senior, he was the nation's fifth-leading scorer.

Entrepreneurship
In April 2014, Westervelt launched a new company HEX Performance based in Baltimore, Maryland. The company produces "HEX" removes that sweaty smell leftover in performance synthetic fabrics. HEX is now being sold at Wegmans, Whole Foods Market, Harris Teeter, Shoprite, and Canadian Tire.

Professional career

MLL
Westervelt was selected by the Denver Outlaws fourth overall in the 2007 MLL Collegiate Draft.

In 2011 he was traded to the Chesapeake Bayhawks, then in 2016 to the New York Lizards.

NLL
He was acquired by the Philadelphia Wings in the third round (37th overall) in the 2007 National Lacrosse League entry draft. During the 2009 NLL season, he was named to the All-Star Game as an injury replacement.

On September 13, 2013, Westervelt was traded to the Colorado Mammoth for Ryan Hotaling and draft picks. He was not included in the published final roster for Colorado, so his status with that team is not known.

Statistics

MLL

NLL

University of Maryland, Baltimore County

References

1985 births
Living people
American lacrosse players
Colorado Mammoth players
Major League Lacrosse players
National Lacrosse League All-Stars
People from Bel Air, Maryland
Philadelphia Wings players
UMBC Retrievers men's lacrosse players